BFO is an abbreviation that stands for:

 Basic Formal Ontology
 Beat frequency oscillator used to create an audio frequency signal for receiving continuous wave (Morse code) transmissions 
 The Black Forest Observatory in Germany
 BiFeO3 (Bismuth ferrite), an inorganic chemical compound
 Boron monofluoride monoxide
 Budapest Festival Orchestra
 Bunker Fuel Oil, a (low-cost) type of fuel oil
 Federal Consultative Assembly (Bijeenkomst voor Federaal Overleg), an organisation of federal states of the United States of Indonesia